Amalie Haehnel, also Amalie Hähnel, (1807 in Vienna – 2 May 1849 in Berlin) was an Austrian operatic singer (contralto, mezzo-soprano) and vocal teacher.

Life 
Haehnel received her musical training from Antonio Salieri and Giuseppe Ciccimarra and first appeared before the public as a concert singer. Even then, her voice had a range of over two octaves, from C-sharp to two-stroked F-sharp, and her debut caused a sensation. Haehnel's theatre career began with her performance of Rosine in The Barber of Seville at the Wiener Hofoper.

She subsequently accepted engagements at several Austrian theatres and finally followed a call to the Königsstädtisches Theater in Berlin in 1832. There she worked with great success and soon became the darling of the audience. In 1841 she was appointed to the Kingliche Bühne and awarded the title of Kammersängerin for her achievements. In 1845 she joined the court theatre and worked as a vocal trainer.<ref>Amalie Haehnel on Grosses Sängerlexikon </ref>

 Student 
 Clara Stich

 Notes 

 References 

 Further reading 
 Ludwig Eisenberg: Großes biographisches Lexikon der Deutschen Bühne im XIX. Jahrhundert. Paul List publisher, Leipzig 1903,.
 Ludwig Eisenberg: Das geistige Wien. Künstler- und Schriftsteller-Lexikon, Mittheilungen über Wiener Architekten, Bildhauer, Bühnenkünstler, Graphiker, Journalisten, Maler, Musiker und Schriftsteller. Vienna: Daberkow 1889 ff. 
 
 Barbara Boisits: Hähnel, Amalie in Oesterreichisches Musiklexikon''. Online edition, Vienna 2002 ff., ; Print edition: Vol. 2, Österreichischen Akademie der Wissenschaften publishing house, Vienna 2003, .

External links 

Austrian operatic mezzo-sopranos
Contraltos
Voice teachers
1807 births
1849 deaths
Musicians from Vienna